Shoal Creek Drive is a village in Newton County, Missouri, United States. The population was 337 at the 2010 census. It is part of the Joplin, Missouri Metropolitan Statistical Area.

Geography

Demographics

2010 census
As of the census of 2010, there were 337 people, 141 households, and 96 families living in the village. The racial makeup of the village was 95.0% White, 0.6% African American, 1.8% Native American, 0.6% Asian, 1.2% from other races, and 0.9% from two or more races. Hispanic or Latino of any race were 5.0% of the population.

There were 141 households, of which 24.1% had children under the age of 18 living with them, 53.2% were married couples living together, 8.5% had a female householder with no husband present, 6.4% had a male householder with no wife present, and 31.9% were non-families. 25.5% of all households were made up of individuals, and 12.8% had someone living alone who was 65 years of age or older. The average household size was 2.39 and the average family size was 2.88.

The median age in the village was 47.3 years. 19% of residents were under the age of 18; 5.8% were between the ages of 18 and 24; 22.5% were from 25 to 44; 32.3% were from 45 to 64; and 20.5% were 65 years of age or older. The gender makeup of the village was 50.4% male and 49.6% female.

2000 census
As of the census of 2000, there were 346 people, 133 households, and 104 families living in the village. The population density was 735.6 people per square mile (284.2/km). There were 155 housing units at an average density of 329.6 per square mile (127.3/km). The racial makeup of the village was 92.77% White, 2.02% African American, 2.60% Native American, 0.29% Asian, 0.29% Pacific Islander, 0.58% from other races, and 1.45% from two or more races. Hispanic or Latino of any race were 2.31% of the population.

There were 133 households, out of which 32.3% had children under the age of 18 living with them, 64.7% were married couples living together, 6.8% had a female householder with no husband present, and 21.8% were non-families. 21.1% of all households were made up of individuals, and 9.8% had someone living alone who was 65 years of age or older. The average household size was 2.60 and the average family size was 2.92.

In the village, the population was spread out, with 24.3% under the age of 18, 6.4% from 18 to 24, 26.3% from 25 to 44, 22.5% from 45 to 64, and 20.5% who were 65 years of age or older. The median age was 41 years. For every 100 females, there were 95.5 males. For every 100 females age 18 and over, there were 100.0 males.

The median income for a household in the village was $39,167, and the median income for a family was $41,250. Males had a median income of $27,188 versus $24,688 for females. The per capita income for the village was $21,253. About 7.4% of families and 7.5% of the population were below the poverty line, including 10.3% of those under age 18 and none of those age 65 or over.

References

 https://web.archive.org/web/20131013222920/http://2010.census.gov/2010census/popmap/

Villages in Newton County, Missouri
Joplin, Missouri, metropolitan area
Villages in Missouri